The Ministry of Labour and Employment (abbreviated MTE) is a cabinet-level federal ministry in Brazil. The current Minister of Labour is Luiz Marinho.

See also
 Other ministries of Labour
 Other ministries of Employment

References

External links
 Official site

Labour and Employment
Brazil